The High Court of Justice of Castilla-La Mancha is the highest body of the judiciary in the autonomous community of Castile-La Mancha (Spain). It is headquartered in the city of Albacete.

He is heir to the Royal Court of Albacete established by Queen Maria Christina in Albacete in 1834 with jurisdiction over much of Castile-La Mancha and the Region of Murcia.

The presidency of the High Court of Justice of Castilla-La Mancha has been held since 2005 by Vicente Rouco, who, currently, is serving his third consecutive term.

Composition 
At present the High Court of Castile-La Mancha is divided into the following organs:
 Presidency
 Government
 Civil and Criminal
 Contentious-Administrative
 Social

References

Castilla–La Mancha
Castile-La Mancha